Cyclonic Storm Nisha (IMD designation: BOB 07, JTWC designation: 06B) was a fairly weak but catastrophic  tropical cyclone that struck Sri Lanka, and India which killed over 200. It was the ninth tropical cyclone of the 2008 North Indian Ocean cyclone season, and the seventh tropical cyclone in the Bay of Bengal that year.

Meteorological history

On November 24 an area of low pressure formed over land in Sri Lanka. Later that day the Joint Typhoon Warning Center assessed the low-pressure area's chance of becoming a significant tropical cyclone within 24 hours as 'poor', due to the minimal convection near the low-level circulation center. The next morning the JTWC issued a Tropical Cyclone Formation Alert on the low-pressure area, stating it had a 'good' chance of becoming a significant tropical cyclone within 24 hours, as the Low Level Circulation Center was moving into the Bay of Bengal. Two hours later the IMD upgraded the area of low pressure to Depression BOB 07. Three hours later the India Meteorological Department reported that the depression had intensified into a Deep Depression whilst remaining stationary. Later that day the JTWC upgraded the Deep Depression to Tropical Cyclone 06B and reported that the depression had wind speeds equivalent to a tropical storm, on the Saffir–Simpson hurricane scale.

Early on November 26, the India Meteorological Department upgraded the deep depression to a Cyclonic Storm and named it Nisha. Later that day as Nisha moved northwest towards India, both the JTWC and the IMD reported that Nisha had reached its peak wind speeds of 55 kts (63 mph 102 km/h ) 45 knots (52 mph 83 km/h ). Early the next day the IMD reported that Cyclonic Storm Nisha had made landfall in Tamil Nadu, India, at 0030 UTC. Later that day as the IMD reported that Nisha had weakened into a deep depression, The JTWC issued their final advisory on Nisha. The IMD then reported that Nisha had weakened into a Depression and then issued their last advisory the next day, reporting that Nisha had weakened into a well-marked area of low pressure.

Preparations and impact

Sri Lanka
Fifteen people were killed when Nisha hit northern Sri Lanka on November 25, 2008, causing heavy rains and flooding that reportedly displaced between 60,000 and 70,000 people in Vanni and 20,000 people in Jaffna district. Jaffna recorded the highest rainfall since 1918, of 520.1 mm of rain in one week, with the 26 November total rainfall (389.8 mm) being the highest in nine decades.

India
At least 189 people were killed by the heavy rains and floods caused by the Nisha in Tamil Nadu. Some places have recorded extreme rainfall, notably Orathanadu, Thanjavur District where over 660 mm of rain fell in a 24-hour period, breaking the 65-year-old record of highest daily rainfall in Tamil Nadu. In two days, Orathanadu registered 990 mm of rainfall. Previously the highest amount of rainfall in a day was 570 mm registered by Cuddalore on May 18, 1943. During the four-day period from 25 through 28 November, Orathanadu received 1280 mm of rainfall, making it as the 4th wettest Cylone in India to date. A map showing the most affected areas was released by ReliefWeb. Damage in India totaled to 3789 crores, or 800 million in 2008 USD.

See also
 2008 North Indian Ocean cyclone season
 List of wettest tropical cyclones

References

External links

Indian Meteorological Department
Joint Typhoon Warning Center 
Rapid Response, India

2008 North Indian Ocean cyclone season
Cyclonic storms
2000s in Tamil Nadu
Disasters in Tamil Nadu
Tropical cyclones in 2008